Autarchism is a political philosophy that promotes the principles of individualism and the moral ideology of individual liberty and self-reliance. It rejects compulsory government and supports the elimination of government in favor of ruling oneself to the exclusion of rule by others.

Overview 
Robert LeFevre, recognized as an autarchist by Murray Rothbard, distinguished autarchism from anarchy, whose economics he felt entailed interventions contrary to freedom. In professing "a sparkling and shining individualism" while "it advocates some kind of procedure to interfere with the processes of a free market", anarchy seemed to LeFevre to be self-contradictory. He situated the fundamental premise of autarchy within the Stoicism of philosophers such as Zeno, Epicurus and Marcus Aurelius, which he summarized in the credo "Control yourself". 

Fusing these influences, LeFevre arrived at the autarchist philosophy: "The Stoics provide the moral framework; the Epicureans, the motivation; the praxeologists, the methodology. I propose to call this package of ideological systems autarchy, because autarchy means self-rule". LeFevre stated that "the bridge between Spooner and modern-day autarchists was constructed primarily by persons such as H. L. Mencken, Albert Jay Nock, and Mark Twain".

Ralph Waldo Emerson (1803–1882) biographer Robert D. Richardson described Emerson's anarchy as autarchy', rule by self". Philip Jenkins has stated that "Emersonian ideas stressed individual liberation, autarchy, self-sufficiency and self-government, and strenuously opposed social conformity".

See also 
 Absolute monarchy
 Anarcho-capitalism
 Autarky
 Autocracy
 Egoist anarchism
 Existentialist anarchism
 Individualist anarchism
 Rugged individualism
 Self-governance
 Self-ownership
 Voluntaryism

References

External links 

 The Nature of Man and His Government by Robert LeFevre – an introduction by Rose Wilder Lane (1959).

Anarcho-capitalism by form
Ethical schools and movements
Libertarianism by form